Sabal miamiensis, the Miami palmetto, is a rare plant species known only from Dade County, Florida, in the vicinity of the City of Miami. It is seriously threatened and may possibly already be extinct in the wild although it is still in cultivation as an ornamental. It has been collected in nature only from rocky pinelands in the region, areas now rapidly becoming urbanized. The formal description of this as a new species was published in 1985, based largely on specimens collected in 1901.

Sabal miamiensis is closely related to S. etonia but has larger fruits ( in diameter) and an inflorescences with 3 orders of branching instead of 2. Flowers are creamy white, each 5-5.5 mm long. Fruits are black and fleshy.

References

miamiensis
Endemic flora of Florida
Plants described in 1985
Flora without expected TNC conservation status